John Gould (1 October 1872 – 4 December 1908) was an Australian cricketer. He played eleven first-class matches for New South Wales between 1891/92 and 1895/96.

See also
 List of New South Wales representative cricketers

References

External links
 

1872 births
1908 deaths
Australian cricketers
New South Wales cricketers
Cricketers from Sydney